The election for Resident Commissioner to the United States House of Representatives took place on November 4, 1952 the same day as the larger Puerto Rican general election and the United States elections, 1952.

Candidates for Resident Commissioner
 Carmen Rivera de Alvarado for the Puerto Rican Independence Party
 Antonio Fernós-Isern for the Popular Democratic Party
 Angel Fernández Sánchez for the Socialist Party
 Juan B. Soto for the Republican Party

Election results

See also 
Puerto Rican general election, 1952

References 

Puerto Rico
1952